Beloye (meaning White) was a small freshwater lake in Nizhny Novgorod Oblast, Russia. It lay approximately 300 meters from the village of Bolotnikovo. In May 2005, the lake disappeared overnight for unknown reasons. It is speculated that the lake may have drained into an underground river or cave system due to subsidence. Seventy years before the 2005 disappearance, in 1935, several houses were destroyed under similar circumstances. In 1600, there was a church standing where Beloye Lake was, which sank into the ground over a day.

See also 
 Lake Peigneur

References

External links
 May, 2005 BBC Article
 May, 2005 Pravda.ru Article
 July, 2006 Pravda.ru Article on the Lake's Return

Lakes of Nizhny Novgorod Oblast
Shrunken lakes